Zakir Baghirov may refer to:
 Zakir Baghirov (composer)
 Zakir Baghirov (minister)